Georgia State Route 11 Connector may refer to:

 Georgia State Route 11 Connector (Arcade–Jefferson): a connector route that exists in Arcade and Jefferson
 Georgia State Route 11 Connector (Gainesville): a connector route that exists in Gainesville
 Georgia State Route 11 Connector (Lakeland): a connector route that exists in Lakeland
 Georgia State Route 11 Connector (Perry): a connector route that exists in Perry

011 Connector